Bahni Turpin (born June 4, 1962 in Pontiac, Michigan) is an American audiobook narrator and stage and screen actor based out of Los Angeles. Her audiobook career includes some of the most popular and critically-acclaimed books in recent years, including The Help and The Hate U Give. She has won 9 Audie Awards, including Audiobook of the Year for Children of Blood and Bone; 14 Earphone Awards; and 2 Odyssey Awards. Turpin has also earned a place on AudioFile magazine's list of Golden Voice Narrators, and in 2016, she was named Audible's Narrator of the Year. In 2018, Audible inducted her into the Narrator Hall of Fame.

Career 
Turpin began her acting career in 1991 with her debut role in the film Daughters of the Dust, the first feature film directed by an African-American woman distributed theatrically in the United States. She has since appeared on television shows such as Criminal Minds.

Turpin is also a member of the Cornerstone Theater Company.

Outside of acting, Turpin has been a long-time yoga instructor.

Reviews 
Discussing the power Turpin brings to every role she plays, Audible wrote, "Turpin’s embodiment of characters helps to further pull you into the author’s world and drive home all of the pain and emotion they are carrying."  They continued, stating that "her embodiment of characters that span a wide range of ages and cultural backgrounds is unparalleled."
 House of Rougeaux "Actor Turpin’s skill with a vast array of accents brings the characters of Jaeckel’s multigenerational novel to life. …Turpin’s multifaceted performance enhances this rich tapestry of a novel."
 The Hate U Give: Turpin’s remarkable sensitivity carries this performance to the ranks of greatness.

Awards and honors

Awards

Best of the Year lists

Selected narrations

Filmography

References 

21st-century American actresses
Audiobook narrators
Living people
1962 births
Audie Awards
People from Pontiac, Michigan
Actors from Michigan
American voice actresses